Guntheria coorongensis is a species of mite in the family Trombiculidae, found from the tip of Cape York in Queensland to South Australia. 

The genus was first described as Schoengastia coorongense by Hirst in 1929.Hirst, S. 1929. Note on the 'Tea-tree Itch-mite' (Trombicula hirsti, Sambon = T. pseudo-akamushi, Hatori?). Annals and Magazine of Natural History 10 3: 564-565 The species epithet indicates that it comes from the Coorong.

The larva of these mites ('chiggers') when feeding embed themselves in host animals, and for human hosts, the resulting skin irritation has been known as 'tea-tree itch' or 'duck-shooters itch'.  Host animals recorded include native rats and marsupials: (from Queensland): Antechinus stuartii, other Antechinus species, Rattus lutreolus lutreolus, R. sordidus sordidus, R. leucopus leucopus; (from Victoria),  A. swainsonii  and  A. minimus; (from South Australia): R.fuscipes greyii. This mite has also been listed as a parasite of the Northern Quoll in the Northern Territory.

References

Trombiculidae
Arachnids of Australia
Taxa described in 1939